Colonel Brockhill Newburgh ( – 11 January 1741) was an Irish politician.

He was the second son of Thomas Newburgh and his wife Mary, the daughter of Brockhill Taylor, M.P, of Ballyhaise, who had represented Cavan Borough in the Irish House of Commons. He inherited the estate of Ballyhaise in 1697 on the death of his elder brother. He was appointed High Sheriff of Cavan for 1704.

From 1715 until 1727, Newburgh sat as Member of Parliament (MP) for Cavan County. He was chairman of the Linen Board. He built Ballyhaise House, and did much to improve the village of Ballyhaise, erecting the first stone bridge there.

He married Maria, the daughter of Oliver More of Salestown, Co. Kildare, and died on 11 January 1741/2, leaving four sons and two daughters. 
His eldest son and heir was the poet Thomas Newburgh, publisher of Essays, Poetical, Moral, &c., 1769, a work that perhaps contains notes from, and is sometimes attributed to, Brockhill Newburgh.

References

 'Notes and Queries', 26 July 1913.
 'Particulars relating to the life and character of the late Brockhill Newburgh', 1761.

1660s births
1741 deaths
Politicians from County Cavan
Irish MPs 1715–1727
Members of the Parliament of Ireland (pre-1801) for County Cavan constituencies
High Sheriffs of Cavan